Donald Adams (8 June 1880 – 8 January 1976) was an English first-class cricketer. He was born in Ockley, Surrey and died in Walton-on-Thames. A fast medium bowler, he played one match for Surrey County Cricket Club in 1902 against W.G. Grace's London County at Crystal Palace Park. His only first-class wicket was that of W.G. Grace, bowled in the first innings for 10. London County won the match by 196 runs.

References

1880 births
1976 deaths
English cricketers
Surrey cricketers